Alseodaphne micrantha is a species of plant in the family Lauraceae. It is a tree endemic to Peninsular Malaysia. It is threatened by habitat loss.

References

micrantha
Endemic flora of Peninsular Malaysia
Trees of Peninsular Malaysia
Taxonomy articles created by Polbot

Critically endangered flora of Asia